Gordon Rayfield is an American television writer.

Career

All My Children
Head writer: (Solo: December 2002 – February 21, 2003); (with Anna Theresa Cascio: February 24, 2003 – June 30, 2003)
Associate Head Writer: June 2002 – December 2002
Another World
Associate Head Writer: 1998–1999
As the World Turns
Script writer: August 14, 2008 – May 31, 2010
Days of Our Lives
Associate Head Writer: December 7, 2006 – January 24, 2008
Law & Order
Script Writer
One Life to Live
Associate Head Writer 1996–1997; May 25, 2010 – September 1, 2010
Script Writer: 2003, 2004

Awards and nominations
Daytime Emmy Awards
Nominations: (2003 & 2004; Outstanding Drama Series Writing Team All My Children and Outstanding Writing in a Children's Special Our America)
Writers Guild of America Award
Win: (1996; Children's Script; CBS Schoolbreak Special, "Stand Up")
Win: (2004; Best Daytime Serial; All My Children)
Win: (2011; Best Daytime Serial; As the World Turns)

References

American soap opera writers
American male television writers
Year of birth missing (living people)
Living people